Świat Gier Komputerowych (English: Computer Games World) was a Polish video gaming magazine. It was first issue was released on 14 December 1992 as an addition to the Amiga magazine Amigowiec (deemed the 8-page 0th issue). The permanent editorial team consisted of about 15 people. The first editor-in-chief was Mirosław Domosud, but he was replaced by Piotr Pieńkowski, who held this position until the paper was discontinued. It was intended mainly for older players, written in a more formal style than competitors such as Top Secret and CD-Action. In February 1997, the 50th issue was issued, while April 2001 saw the hundredth issue be published. The magazine celebrated its tenth anniversary in February 2003, being the only such magazine on the market to reach this milestone. The last issue appeared in July 2003 as a double. The decision was due to the unsatisfactory sales of the magazine, around 50,000 copies per month. After its dissolution, an attempt was made to revive the paper as Nowy Świat Gier Komputerowych, however this only lasted for two months.

References

External links
Świat Gier Komputerowych at the Internet Archive

1992 establishments in Poland
2003 disestablishments in Poland
Defunct magazines published in Poland
Magazines established in 1992
Magazines disestablished in 2003
Video game magazines published in Poland
Polish-language magazines